Burton E Freeman (July 3, 1924 – October 4, 2016) was an American physicist and explosive engineer who researched the calculated expedition timetables for the American Project Orion nuclear propulsion spacecraft in the 1950s and 60s. He calculated timetables for round trips to Mars and Venus.

Burt had commented that "In retrospect" Orion "was a really crazy idea". "A great deal of force of personality and intellect drove this project". Burt lived in San Diego until moving to Kihei, HI in 2015, where he lived until his death on October 4, 2016.

References

External links
 http://www.sandiegouniontribune.com/news/2011/jul/17/project-orion-road-not-taken-space/
 http://www.sandiegouniontribune.com/news/environment/sd-me-burton-freeman-20161122-story.html

2016 deaths
1924 births
People from Pasadena, California
American physicists
Engineers from California